Bonelliidae is a family of marine worms (Class Echiura, phylum Annelida) noted for being sexually dimorphic, with males being tiny in comparison with the females. They occupy burrows in the seabed in many parts of the world's oceans, often at great depths.

Characteristics
Members of the class Echiura are plump, unsegmented worms, commonly known as spoonworms. The mouth is at the anterior end of the trunk and a flattened proboscis extends forward in front of the mouth. The ventral side of the proboscis has a ciliated channel along which food particles and mucus are moved towards the mouth. Close behind the mouth are two hooked chaetae and one or two nephridial pores. The gut is much longer than the body and is folded and coiled inside the coelom (body cavity). The anus is at the posterior end of the body and two anal vesicles with ciliated funnels open into the cloaca.

In the family Bonelliidae, the females are very much larger than the dwarf males, and in most, if not all, instances the males live on or inside the female. The anal vesicles of the females are sac-like and bear the ciliated funnels on tubules, which branch in most genera. Some genera lack the hooked chaetae behind the mouth, and none of the genera have chaetae at the posterior end of the trunk. Most genera contain the pigment bonellin which gives them a green colour and may have antibiotic or defensive properties.

Males are quite different in appearance; the minute, ciliated body consists of little except a gonad, a seminal vesicle and two protonephridia. In most species, the male is found inside the genital sac of the female. The sex of a bonelliid spoonworm depends where the planktonic larva settles. If it settles on an adult worm of its own species, it develops into a dwarf male, but if it settles anywhere else, it develops into a full-size female.

Distribution and habitat
The worms inhabit burrows they dig in soft sediment, extending the flattened proboscis from the burrow along the surface of the sediment.

Genera
The World Register of Marine Species includes the following genera in the family:-

Acanthobonellia Fisher, 1948
Acanthohamingia Ikeda, 1910
Achaetobonellia Fisher, 1953
Alomasoma Zenkevitch, 1958
Amalosoma Fisher, 1948
Archibonellia Fischer, 1919
Bengalus Biseswar, 2006
Biporus Murina & Popkov, 2000
Bonellia Rolando, 1822
Bruunellia Zenkevitch, 1966
Charcotus DattaGupta, 1981
Choanostomellia Zenkevitch, 1964
Dattaguptus Murina & Popkov, 2000
Eubonellia Fisher, 1946
Hamingia Danielssen & Koren, 1880
Ikedella Monro, 1927
Jakobia Zenkevitch, 1958
Kurchatovus DattaGupta, 1977
Maxmuelleria Bock, 1942
Metabonellia Stephen & Edmonds, 1972
Nellobia Fisher, 1946
Prometor Fisher, 1948
Protobonellia Ikeda, 1908
Pseudobonellia Johnston & Tiegs, 1919
Pseudoikedella Murina, 1978
Sluiterina Monro, 1927
Torbenwolffia Zenkevitch, 1966
Vitjazema Zenkevitch, 1958
Zenkevitchiola Murina, 1978

See also
Maxmuelleria lankesteri

References

Echiurans